The Mrs Merton Show was a mock talk show starring Caroline Aherne as the elderly host Mrs Dorothy Merton.

Originally portrayed as 'Mrs. Murton' in a pilot for Yorkshire TV which was not picked up, Caroline Aherne retooled the character, making her older, and recorded a second pilot in 1993 for Granada Television, who commissioned the series. Running from 10 February 1995 to 2 April 1998, it was produced by Granada and aired on the BBC. The writers included Aherne, Craig Cash, Henry Normal and, for the first few series, Dave Gorman.

Prior to television success, Aherne's Mrs Merton character appeared on Frank Sidebottom's album 5/9/88 and on Aherne's KFM Radio show in Stockport. After that she made a few appearances on local television in the north west including Granada's Saturday morning show Express! and on the Yorkshire Television series, Frank’s Fantastic Shed Show. On the former show, presented by I Am Kloot's John 'Johnny Dangerously' Bramwell and Sumy Kuraishe, she was the regular celebrity interviewer and interviewed guests from a number of random locations in the north west, whilst the latter show was with Chris Sievey in his Sidebottom persona.

Her national television debut came on the 1991 Channel 4 gameshow Remote Control, hosted by Anthony H Wilson. The talk show was followed up by a sitcom, Mrs Merton and Malcolm, based on Mrs Merton and her son Malcolm, who was played by Craig Cash.

History 
For the first two series, the house band was Hooky and the Boys, fronted by Aherne's then husband Peter Hook. Following their marital break up the band was replaced by The Patrick Trio from the 1996 Christmas special until the end of the show's run in 1998.

In 1997 the production moved to Las Vegas for a series of specials with Hollywood stars. The series was not well received and was slated by critic Garry Bushell amongst others. For the following (and final) series back in the UK, Bushell was a guest and got appropriately roasted by Mrs Merton and her studio audience.

In an interview in November 2001 Aherne revealed that she did not want to carry on with the show and wanted to write a sitcom with Craig Cash and only agreed to a final series if she could do it. This became the BAFTA Award winning The Royle Family.

In August 2006 a poll of 4,000 people was commissioned by UKTV Gold for the best comic one-liner. In second place was a line from The Mrs Merton Show when she famously asked Debbie McGee, "So, what first attracted you to the millionaire Paul Daniels?"

In 2022, the Patrick Trio-era series was acquired by That's TV for its comedy line-up which also included repeats of Hale and Pace and Monty Python's Flying Circus

Format 
The Mrs Merton Show was a mock chat show which featured real-life celebrities getting outrageous faux-naïf questions from Aherne in her Mrs Merton persona. In one memorable example the wife of magician Paul Daniels, Debbie McGee, was asked "So, what first attracted you to the millionaire Paul Daniels?" whilst in another episode Aherne asked comedian Bernard Manning, after he had clashed with One Foot in the Grave's Richard Wilson, “Who do you vote for now Hitler's dead?” in regards to his racist attitudes.

As well as the celebrity guests and regular band, the show featured a few appearances from Craig Cash as Malcolm and a had audience of pensioners, who would sit behind Mrs Merton and the guests, and who would be used for regular discussion segments and for Aherne to field questions from. This group included a large number of older ladies who would be used for the programme from week-to-week and also included spots for the former child actor Roy Williams, who was known for his brightly coloured clothes and odd views, former Manchester City goalkeeper Harry Dowd and Stockport pensioner Horace Mendelsohn.

Episodes 

 Christmas Special
 Titled: "Mrs Merton in Las Vegas"

Media releases 
The Best of The Mrs Merton Show: Series One (VHS) – Released: 7 October 1996
The Best of The Mrs Merton Show: Series Two (VHS) – Released: 4 November 1996
The Complete Series (DVD) – Released: 25 February 2008

References

External links 

1993 British television series debuts
1998 British television series endings
1990s British comedy television series
1990s British television talk shows
BBC television comedy
Television series by ITV Studios
Television shows produced by Granada Television
English-language television shows